Fernando Rodriguez Jr. (born 1969) is a United States district judge of the United States District Court for the Southern District of Texas.

Biography 

Rodriguez earned his Bachelor of Arts from Yale University and his Juris Doctor, with honors, from the University of Texas School of Law.

From 1997 to 1998, he served as a briefing attorney for then-Associate Justice Nathan Hecht of the Supreme Court of Texas.
Before joining International Justice Mission, Rodriguez was a partner in the Dallas office of Baker Botts LLP, where his practice focused on commercial litigation.

Before becoming a judge, Rodriguez worked as a field office director in the Dominican Republic for International Justice Mission, where he led efforts to combat sex trafficking of children. His work contributed to the rescue of more than 110 victims and 21 convictions of the perpetrators. He previously led similar efforts against the sexual abuse of children in Bolivia.

Federal judicial service 

On September 7, 2017, President Donald Trump nominated Rodriguez to serve as a United States District Judge of the United States District Court for the Southern District of Texas, to the seat vacated by Judge Gregg Costa, who was elevated to the U.S. Court of Appeals for the Fifth Circuit on May 20, 2014. On November 29, 2017, a hearing was held on his nomination before the Senate Judiciary Committee. On January 11, 2018, his nomination was reported out of committee by a voice vote. On June 5, 2018, the U.S. Senate voted to invoke cloture on his nomination by a 94–1 vote. Later that same day, Rodriguez was confirmed by a 96–0 vote. He received his judicial commission on June 12, 2018.

See also  
 List of Hispanic/Latino American jurists

References

External links 
 

1969 births
Living people
20th-century American lawyers
21st-century American lawyers
21st-century American judges
Hispanic and Latino American judges
Judges of the United States District Court for the Southern District of Texas
People from Harlingen, Texas
Texas lawyers
United States district court judges appointed by Donald Trump
University of Texas School of Law alumni
Yale University alumni
People associated with Baker Botts
Latino conservatism in the United States